Kigali Innovation City (KIC) is a technology cluster planned for Kigali in Rwanda. The Government of Rwanda hopes to attract both domestic and foreign universities, technology companies and biotech firms, and have commercial and retail real estate. It is intended to be built on 70 hectares of land in Kigali's Special Economic Zone in Gasabo District.

Kigali Innovation City is part of the Government of Rwanda's Vision 2020 program and a public–private partnership between the Government and Africa50. Africa50, an infrastructure investment platform founded by the African Development Bank (AfDB) and African states, is a co-sponsor and partner that will help develop and finance the project.

Kigali Innovation City has been compared to the planned Konza Technology City in Kenya, announced in 2008, and a planned technology cluster in Ghana, announced in 2013.

See also
Konza Technopolis
Tatu City
Silicon Savannah

References

Science and technology in Rwanda
High-technology business districts in Africa
Gasabo District